The clothing worn by plague doctors was intended to protect them from airborne diseases during outbreaks of bubonic plague in Europe. It is often seen as a symbol of death and disease. However, the costume was worn by a comparatively small number of late Renaissance and early modern physicians studying and treating plague patients.

Description

The costume consists of a leather hat, mask with glass eyes and a beak, stick to remove clothes of a plague victim, gloves, waxed linen robe, and boots. 

The typical mask had glass openings for the eyes and a curved beak shaped like a bird's beak with straps that held the beak in front of the doctor's nose. The mask had two small nose holes and was a type of respirator which contained aromatic items. The beak could hold dried flowers (commonly roses and carnations), herbs (commonly lavender and peppermint), camphor, or a vinegar sponge, as well as juniper berry, ambergris, cloves, labdanum, myrrh, and storax. The purpose of the mask was to keep away bad smells such as decaying bodies and the smell taken with the most caution was known as miasma, a noxious form of "bad air". This was thought to be the principal cause of the disease. Doctors believed the herbs would counter the "evil" smells of the plague and prevent them from becoming infected. Though contemporary theories about the plague's nature were incorrect, it is likely that the costume actually did afford the wearer some immunity. The garments covered the body, shielding against splattered blood, lymph and cough droplets, and the waxed robe prevented fleas (the true carriers of the plague) from touching the body or clinging to the linen.

The wide-brimmed leather hat indicated their profession. Doctors used wooden canes in order to point out areas needing attention and to examine patients without touching them. The canes were also used to keep people away and to remove clothing from plague victims without having to touch them.

History
The exact origins of the costume are unclear, as most depictions come from satirical writings and political cartoons. The beaked plague doctor inspired costumes in Italian theatre as a symbol of general horror and death, though some historians insist that the plague doctor was originally fictional and inspired the real plague doctors later. Depictions of the beaked plague doctor rose in response to superstition and fear about the unknown source of the plague. Often, these plague doctors were the last thing a patient would see before death; therefore, the doctors were seen as a foreboding of death.

The garments were first mentioned by a physician to King Louis XIII of France, Charles de L'Orme, who wrote in a 1619 plague outbreak in Paris that he developed an outfit made of Moroccan goat leather, including boots, breeches, a long coat, hat, and gloves modeled after a soldier's canvas gown which went from the neck to the ankle. The garment was impregnated with similar fragrant items as the mask. L'Orme wrote that the mask had a "nose half a foot long, shaped like a beak, filled with perfume with only two holes, one on each side near the nostrils, but that can suffice to breathe and to carry along with the air one breathes the impression of the drugs enclosed further along in the beak."

The Genevan physician, Jean-Jacques Manget, in his 1721 work Treatise on the Plague written just after the Great Plague of Marseille, describes the costume worn by plague doctors at Nijmegen in 1636–1637. The costume forms the frontispiece of Manget's 1721 work. Their robes, leggings, hats, and gloves were also made of Morocco leather. This costume was also worn by plague doctors during the Naples Plague of 1656, which killed 145,000 people in Rome and 300,000 in Naples.

Carnival

The costume is also associated with a commedia dell'arte character called Il Medico della Peste (lit.: The Plague Doctor), who wears a distinctive plague doctor's mask. The Venetian mask was normally white, consisting of a hollow beak and round eye-holes covered with clear glass, and is one of the distinctive masks worn during the Carnival of Venice.

Steampunk, Cosplay, and Modern Fictional Plague Doctor Characters
Plague doctor costumes have seen a growing popularity in pop culture, film, television, and cosplay, though the plague doctor character has changed quite a bit from the historical plague doctors of Germany and Venice. The historical plague doctor costume was adapted into a series of 13 fictional characters by sculptural artist Tom Banwell beginning in 2010. 

"Dr. Beulenpest" was the first steampunk plague doctor character ever created. 
"Dr. Beulenpest" was featured in an exhibit at the Hangaram Design Museum in Seoul, South Korea entitled "Steampunk. The Art of Victorian Futurism".
Many of the features commonly associated with the plague doctor costume were originally featured in Tom Banwell's sculptures but came to define the modern-day plague doctor costume and character. "Dr. Beulenpest" was the first plague doctor mask to be made from black leather, common among modern-day plague doctor costumes although historical plague doctor masks were brown or white. "Dr. Beulenpest" was the first plague doctor mask, fictional or historical, to feature rivets in its construction. In particular, the "nasal strip" as Tom called it when he created it (the strip of leather that runs down the ridge of the beak and has rivets along each side to attach the leather panels) is a common feature of many modern-day fictional plague doctor characters and costumes. 
"Dr. Beulenpest" was the first plague doctor character to be imagined outside of the era of the European Black Plague. "Dr. Beulenpest" was the first plague doctor to feature goggle-like metal rings around the eye lenses and a metal beak tip.

Covid 19

During the international Coronavirus pandemic beginning in 2020, the plague doctor costume grew in popularity due to its relevance to the pandemic, with news reports of plague doctor-costumed individuals in public places showing photos of people wearing Tom Banwell's plague doctor costumes.

See also

References

Footnotes

Works cited

 Bauer, S. Wise, The Story of the World Activity Book Two: The Middle Ages : From the Fall of Rome to the Rise of the Renaissance, Peace Hill Press, 2003, 
 Boeckl, Christine M., Images of plague and pestilence: iconography and iconology, Truman State Univ Press, 2000, 
 Byfield, Ted, Renaissance: God in Man, A.D. 1300 to 1500: But Amid Its Splendors, Night Falls on Medieval Christianity, Christian History Project, 2010, 
 Byrne, Joseph Patrick, Encyclopedia of Pestilence, Pandemics, and Plagues, ABC-CLIO, 2008, 
 Carmichael, Ann G., "SARS and Plagues Past", in SARS in Context: Memory, history, policy, ed. by Jacalyn Duffin and Arthur Sweetman McGill-Queen's University Press, 2006, 
 Center for Advanced Study in Theatre Arts, Western European stages, Volume 14, CASTA, 2002,
 Dolan, Josephine, Goodnow's History of Nursing, W. B. Saunders 1963 (Philadelphia and London), 
 Ellis, Oliver Coligny de Champfleur, A History of Fire and Flame, London: Simkin, Marshall, 1932; repr. Kessinger, 2004, 
 Goodnow, Minnie, Goodnow's history of nursing, W.B. Saunders Co., 1968, OCLC Number: 7085173
 Glaser, Gabrielle, The Nose: A Profile of Sex, Beauty, and Survival, Simon & Schuster, 2003, 
 Grolier Incorporated, The Encyclopedia Americana, Volume 8; Volume 24, Grolier Incorporated, 1998, 
 Hall, Manly Palmer, Horizon, Philosophical Research Society, Inc., 1949
 Hirst, Leonard Fabian, The conquest of plague: a study of the evolution of epidemiology, Clarendon Press, 1953,
 Infectious Diseases Society of America, Reviews of Infectious Diseases, Volume 11, University of Chicago Press, 1989
 Kenda, Barbara, Aeolian winds and the spirit in Renaissance architecture: Academia Eolia revisited, Taylor & Francis, 2006, 
 Killinger, Charles L., Culture and customs of Italy, Greenwood Publishing Group, 2005, 
 Nohl, Johannes, The Black Death: A Chronicle of the Plague, J. & J. Harper Edition 1969, 
 Manget, Jean-Jacques, Traité de la peste recueilli des meilleurs auteurs anciens et modernes, Geneva, 1721, online as PDF, 28Mb download
 Martin, Sean, The Black Death, Book Sales, 2009, 
 Mentzel, Peter, A traveller's history of Venice, Interlink Books, 2006, 
 O'Donnell, Terence, History of life insurance in its formative years, American Conservation Company, 1936
 Paton, Alex, "Cover image", QJM: An International Journal of Medicine, 100.4, 4 April 2007. (A commentary on the issue's cover photograph of The Posy Tree, Mapperton, Dorset.)
 Pommerville, Jeffrey, Alcamo's Fundamentals of Microbiology: Body Systems, Jones & Bartlett Learning, 2009, 
 Pommerville, Jeffrey, Alcamo's Fundamentals of Microbiology, Jones & Bartlett Learning, 2010, 
 Reynolds, Richard C., On doctor[i]ng: stories, poems, essays, Simon & Schuster, 2001, 
 Sandler, Merton, Wine: a scientific exploration, CRC Press, 2003, 
 Sherman, Irwin W., The power of plagues, Wiley-Blackwell, 2006, 
 Stuart, David C., Dangerous garden: the quest for plants to change our lives, frances lincoln ltd, 2004, 
 Timbs, John, The Mirror of literature, amusement, and instruction, Volume 37, J. Limbird, 1841
 Time-Life Books, What life was like in the age of chivalry: medieval Europe, AD 800-1500, 1997
 Turner, Jack, Spice: The History of a Temptation, Random House, 2005, 
 Walker, Kenneth, The story of medicine, Oxford University Press, 1955

External links
 Debunking Popular Misconceptions about Plague Doctor Costumes and How They Were Used

zh-yue:瘟疫醫生

Medical equipment
Medieval European costume
Costume
Gas masks
1630s introductions
Safety clothing